Makki ki roti  is a flat unleavened bread made from corn meal (maize flour), primarily eaten in the Jammu region, Himachal Pradesh, Punjab, Haryana, Rajasthan, Uttar Pradesh, and Uttarakhand in North India & Gujarat, Maharashtra in Western India and also in Nepal. Like most rotis in the Indian subcontinent, it is baked on a tava.

Etymology 
Literally, makkī kī roṭṭī means 'flatbread of maize'. The word Makki is derived from Sanskrit Markaka  and Roti from Sanskrit word Rotīka. Makki ki roti is yellow in color when ready, and has much less cohesive strength, which makes it difficult to handle.

Mode of serving

Although Makki ki Roti is cooked almost all over India, in media it is often presented as a signifier of Punjabi cuisine. However as per Vir Sanghavi, maize was introduced into only recently after British annexation of Punjab in 1850s. While maize, a New World crop, was introduced to the Indian subcontinent in the 16th century by the Portuguese.

Makki ki roti is generally made during winter and is often accompanied with saag (especially sarson ka saag or channa ka saag). In Himachal it is also eaten with  Maah (Urad) daal. Among Dogras there are folk songs talking of Makki di roti like: "मक्के दी रोटी मोइये , सरेआं दा साग हो , पिप्पल मरोड़ी मरोड़ी करी खाना हो ।" Maize food items are also popular in Rajasthan and one of that is maize roti. In fact, maize is one of the staple diet of Bishnois of Rajasthan and Haryana. In Uttar Pradesh, maize roti is also eaten with ghee, butter, jaggery and pickles. In Gujarat, this dish is also known as "Makai No Rotlo".

See also
 List of breads
 Corn tortilla
 Talo (food)

References

Further reading

 
 
 

Indian breads
Indian cuisine
Pakistani breads
Flatbreads
Unleavened breads
Maize dishes
Roti
Punjabi cuisine